The 1933 Norwegian Football Cup was the 32nd season of the Norwegian annual knockout football tournament. The tournament was open for all members of NFF, except those from Northern Norway. The final was played at Ullevaal Stadion in Oslo on 15 October 1933, and Mjøndalen secured their first title with a 3–1 win against Viking. Mjøndalen had previously played two cup finals but lost both in 1924 and 1931, while Viking played their first final. Fredrikstad were the defending champions, but were eliminated by Viking in the fourth round.

Rounds and dates
 First round: 6 August
 Second round: 13 August
 Third round: 27 August
 Fourth round: 10 September
 Quarter-finals: 17 September
 Semi-finals: 1 October
 Final: 15 October

First round

|-
|colspan="3" style="background-color:#97DEFF"|Replay

|}

Second round

|-
|colspan="3" style="background-color:#97DEFF"|Replay

|}

Third round

|-
|colspan="3" style="background-color:#97DEFF"|Replay

|-
|colspan="3" style="background-color:#97DEFF"|2nd replay

|}

Fourth round

|}

Quarter-finals

|}

Semi-finals

|}

Final

Mjøndalen's winning team: Sverre Nordby, Oscar Skjønberg, Hans Andersen, Arthur Simensen, Fritz Hansen, Bjarne Pettersen, Sigurd Andersen, Einar Andersen, Jørgen Hval, Trygve Halvorsen, Arthur Andersen.

See also
1933 in Norwegian football

References

Norwegian Football Cup seasons
Norway
Cup